The Long Short Cut is a 192-page novel by  English author Paul Winterton using the pseudonym Andrew Garve. It was published by Harper and Row in April 1968. 
It was the first book printed completely by electronically controlled typesetting (aka: electronic composition).

Plot 
The story is a traditional thriller. The gentleman of the novel is called Michael Bliss. The novel describes him as attractive, captivating, intelligent, and adventurous. His beautiful blonde female partner is Corrine Lake. She is voluptuous, crafty, and bright. They’re a crafty team to match their wits and nerve against the business society. Bliss is a con man who witnesses a gang shooting in London with a certain businessman involved. Bliss with Miss Lake, being his partner in crime, contrives an ingenious plan to use what he has seen to con a businessman out of a large amount of money. They bribe the businessman out of two million pounds through a confidence trick by offering him a passage to France hidden in a box. Eventually they turn state’s evidence and turn over the businessman for his role in the murder. The businessman is out his money as Bliss and Miss Lake quietly slip away with his money.

Technology 

The publisher notes on the last page that this book was the first book printed involving the technology of electronic type composed by an electron beam. The beam printed pages with speeds up to 600 characters per second using a special computer system designed for the purpose. The text was 10 point in size and put together in the form of a full page displayed on a high resolution cathode ray tube. Haddon Craftsmen had the electronic equipment to produce the book.

The book producer could make changes and corrections more quickly using electronics than using the traditional method of normal composition. Before this electronic method the fastest composition was about ten characters per second. The new electronic composition was 60 times faster. Using the old method of the linotype machine, the cost of producing the book would be about four dollars at the time. The increased speed of the new electronic method brought down the cost considerably and was an economic advantage to the book publisher. Within a decade the new electronic computer method of printing would be commonplace.

References

Bibliography 
 
 
 Kane, Joseph Nathan (1997), Famous First Facts, A Record of First Happenings, Discoveries, and Inventions in American History (Fifth Edition), The H.W. Wilson Company, 

Fiction set in 1968
1968 novels
Printing
Printing processes